Reza Abdollahi (born 1955) is an Iranian politician.

Abdollahi was born in Zanjan. He is a member of the 3rd, 4th, 5th, 6th, 7th, 8th and 9th Islamic Consultative Assembly from the electorate of Mah Neshan and Ijrud. Abdollahi won with 19,459 (42.08%) votes. He, Mohammad-Reza Bahonar and Ahmad Nategh-Nouri are the highest number of
representation in Islamic Consultative Assembly since Iran's 1979 revolution.

References

People from Zanjan, Iran
Deputies of Mah Neshan and Ijrud
Living people
1955 births
Members of the 9th Islamic Consultative Assembly
Members of the 8th Islamic Consultative Assembly
Members of the 7th Islamic Consultative Assembly
Members of the 6th Islamic Consultative Assembly
Members of the 5th Islamic Consultative Assembly
Members of the 4th Islamic Consultative Assembly
Members of the 3rd Islamic Consultative Assembly